Arthur et Robert (also manufacture Arthur et Robert) was a Paris-based wallpaper manufacturer active during the late 18th and early 19th centuries. Named for two British expatriates, the firm produced block printed scenic and trompe-l'œil wallpapers.
Arthur et Robert, which, aside from Réveillon, was the most important wallpaper manufacturer in France in the late 18th century was established by Arthur in 1772, later becoming Arthur et Grenard, and ultimately becoming Arthur et Robert around 1789 when Grenard retired and the paper merchant Francois Robert took his place.

Arthur et Robert wallpapers often used Neoclassical decorative and architectural motifs popular in the Louis XVI, Directoire and Empire styles. Their wallpapers effected the appearance of fabric including silk moirée, velvet, fringe, and tassels. Thomas Jefferson while the United States Ambassador to the Court of Louis XVI (1785–1789), placed orders at the Arthur et Robert shop.

Bibliography
 Halsey, R.T. Haines. "Wall-Papers and Paint in the New American Wing ." The Metropolitan Museum of Art Bulletin. Vol. 19, No. 10. The Metropolitan Museum of Art: October 1924, pp. 236-238.
 Kosuda-Warner, Joanne, and Elisabeth Johnson. Landscape Wallcoverings. Scala Publishers in association with the Cooper-Hewitt, National Design Museum, Smithsonian Institution.
 Helen Bieri-Thomson, "Un salon parisien au cœur du Jura", in Passé simple 71, Jan. 2022, pp. 20-22.

References

External links
 French Wallpaper Museum Rixheim 
 Adelphi Paper Hangings, a contemporary manufacturer of Arthur et Robert designs

Manufacturing companies of France